Eicosatrienoic acid (or icosatrienoic acid) may refer to:

 Dihomo-γ-linolenic acid, (8Z,11Z,14Z)-eicosatrienoic acid
 Mead acid, (5Z,8Z,11Z)-eicosatrienoic acid
 Sciadonic acid, (5Z,11Z,14Z)-eicosatrienoic acid

See also
 Epoxyeicosatrienoic acid